Dmitri Vladimirovich Kovalenko (born 2 August 1982) is a former Russian professional footballer.

Club career
He made his Russian Football National League debut for FC Metallurg Lipetsk on 28 March 2004 in a game against FC Arsenal Tula.

External links
 
 

1982 births
Living people
Russian footballers
Association football defenders
Russian expatriate footballers
Expatriate footballers in Belarus
FC Rotor Volgograd players
FC Metallurg Lipetsk players
FC Torpedo-BelAZ Zhodino players
FC Olimpia Volgograd players
FC Krasnodar players
FC Petrotrest players